Tizard (also Tizzard) is a surname. Notable people with the surname include:

Tizard

 Barbara Tizard (1926–2015), British psychologist and academic
 Bob Tizard (1924–2016), New Zealand politician
 Catherine Tizard (1931–2021), New Zealand mayor and Governor-General
 Henry Tizard (1885–1959), English chemist and inventor
 Tizard Committee
 Tizard Mission
 Judith Tizard (born 1956), New Zealand politician
 Peter Tizard (1916–1993), British paediatrician
 Richard Henry Tizard (1917–2005), British engineer
 Thomas Henry Tizard (1839–1924), English oceanographer
 Tizard Bank, part of the Spratly Islands in the South China Sea

Tizzard
 Colin Tizzard (born 1956), British racehorse trainer
 James Tizzard (born 1982), English cricketer
 Ken Tizzard (born 1969), Canadian rock bassist